This article lists events that occurred during 1986 in Estonia.

Incumbents

Events
Muuga Harbour was opened.

Births
 19 April – Henrik Kalmet, actor and comedian
 1 November – Ksenija Balta, track and field athlete
 18 November – Ragne Veensalu, actress

Deaths

See also
 1986 in Estonian television

References

 
1980s in Estonia
Estonia
Estonia
Years of the 20th century in Estonia